The Great Otis Redding Sings Soul Ballads, simply referred to as Soul Ballads or Sings Soul Ballads, is the second studio album by American soul singer-songwriter Otis Redding, released in 1965. The album was one of the first issued by Volt Records, a sub-label of Stax Records, and Redding's first on the new label.  Like Redding's debut Pain in My Heart (1964), Soul Ballads features both soul classics and originals written by Redding and other Stax Records recording artists. The recording sessions took place at the Stax studios in Memphis. The album features a stereo mix made by engineer Tom Dowd, replacing the early mono mix.

The album features the Booker T. & the M.G.'s, the horn section Memphis Horns and the pianist Isaac Hayes, who possibly first appeared on this album, although this is disputed, as he was not credited on the liner notes. Unlike Redding's debut album, Sings Soul Ballads was released both on Atlantic's subsidiary Atco Records and Stax's Volt Records. While the album and its singles were moderately successful on the music charts, it includes Redding's first top-10 single, "Mr. Pitiful". The album received mixed critical reception.

Recording
The recording session took place at the Stax studios in Memphis. Guitarist Steve Cropper and Stax producer Jim Stewart both agreed with engineer Tom Dowd's decision to install a two-track recorder during the recording of "Mr. Pitiful". The stereo four-input Ampex mixer is used throughout the album, which means that the instrumentation is either in one channel or the other, but the vocals and echo are in only one channel. This is different for mono recordings, where only one channel is used. Sings Soul Ballads features Booker T. & the M.G.'s organist Booker T. Jones, pianist/guitarist Steve Cropper, bassist Donald "Duck" Dunn, drummer Al Jackson, Jr., and the Memphis Horns, consisting of trumpeter Wayne Jackson, tenor saxophonist Charles "Packy" Axton and baritone saxophonist Floyd Newman. The album contains 12 songs, the majority of which are, as the album's name implies, soul ballads.

The album opens with "That's How Strong My Love Is". Written by Roosevelt Jamison and altered by Cropper, the song was first performed by O. V. Wright on Goldwax Records, where it was cut by both Jamison and Wright. Redding's version was released days after the original. The Rolling Stones covered the song shortly afterwards and included it on their album Out of Our Heads (released in July 1965). Isaac Hayes made his debut as a pianist with Otis Redding, possibly on songs "Come to Me" or "Security". It is unclear because prior to 1966, the Memphis Musicians Union kept little or no sessions documentation; Fantasy Records, who bought Stax in 1977, has none at all prior to 1966. That Hayes debuted in 1964 with Redding is known; which song remains in question. "Come to Me", Redding's fourth Volt single, was written by Redding and Phil Walden and became the second song after the Volt session not to feature a horn section. The song is a typical 6/8 ballad and features piano triplets, including an organ. The single peaked at number 69 on Billboards Hot 100 chart.

"Mr. Pitiful" was recorded in December 1964 at the Stax studios. The song was written by both guitarist Steve Cropper and Redding, and was their first collaboration. It was inspired by and written as a response to a statement made by radio disc jockey Moohah Williams, who had nicknamed Redding "Mr. Pitiful" for sounding pitiful when singing ballads. Cropper heard about this and, while taking a shower, got the idea it would make a good song. In the car on the way to the studio, Cropper proposed the idea with a melody already in mind, humming it to Redding. By the time they reached the studio, the song was written and they recorded it in two or three takes. It was released as a single with the B-side "That's How Strong My Love Is". The song became a hit and the album's most successful track, peaking at number 10 on the Billboard R&B and at number 41 on Billboard Hot 100 chart.

Release
Sings Soul Ballads was released in March 1965, with four of the songs from the album chosen to be released as singles. Unlike Redding's first studio album, Pain in My Heart, the album was released both on Atlantic's subsidiary Atco Records and Stax's Volt Records. A remastered CD and CS version was released by Atco on the Elektra label in 1991. On March 8, 2002, 4 Men With Beards released a vinyl version. Rhino/Atlantic issued a digital download release in the MP3 format on July 29, 2008.

Reception

Sings Soul Ballads received mixed critical reception. Lindsay Planer from Allmusic gave a mixed review of the album. While she liked "That's How Strong My Love Is", Chuck Willis' "It's Too Late", "For Your Precious Love" (previously a hit by The Impressions), Sam Cooke's "Nothing Can Change This Love", and Cropper's/Redding's "Mr. Pitiful", she was less enthusiastic about "Chained and Bound", "I Want to Thank You" and "A Woman, a Lover, a Friend", which mimic aspects of Cooke's sound. The second was compared with "Another Saturday Night", the latter with "Everybody Loves to Cha Cha Cha". She gave the album three of five stars. The Rolling Stone Album Guide, on the other hand, gave the album five stars.

Track listing

Personnel
Credits are taken from The Great Otis Redding Sings Soul Balladss liner notes.

Musicians
Otis Redding – vocals
Booker T. Jones – keyboards, organ, piano
Steve Cropper – guitar, keyboards, piano
Johnny Jenkins – guitar
Donald Dunn – bass guitar
Al Jackson Jr. – drums
Wayne Jackson, Sammy Coleman – trumpet
Packy Axton – tenor saxophone
Floyd Newman – baritone saxophone

Production
Paul Ackerman – liner notes
Yves Beauvais – reissue producer
Loring Eutemey – artwork
Dan Hersch – remastering
Bill Inglot – remastering
Jim Stewart – production

Charts

Album

Singles

References
Citations

Bibliography
 

1965 albums
Otis Redding albums
Stax Records albums
Atco Records albums
Albums produced by Booker T. Jones
Albums produced by Jim Stewart (record producer)
Albums produced by Lewie Steinberg
Albums produced by Steve Cropper
Albums produced by Al Jackson Jr.